Pleurophorus caesus is a species of aphodiine dung beetle in the family Scarabaeidae. It is found in Europe and Northern Asia (excluding China), Central America, North America, and South America.

References

Further reading

External links

 

Scarabaeidae
Articles created by Qbugbot
Beetles described in 1796